Federico Laredo Brú (April 23, 1875, Remedios, Las Villas, Cuba –  July 7, 1946, Havana, Cuba) was an attorney and served as President of Cuba from 1936 to 1940. He was married to Leonor Gomez-Montes. Laredo Bru was a Colonel in Cuba’s Liberation Army during the Cuban War of Independence

Rise to power
Laredo Brú's rise to power began in January 1936 as Vice President. When Miguel Mariano Gómez, son of former president José Miguel Gómez, won the presidential election, strongman Fulgencio Batista engineered the impeachment of Gómez in December 1936 for having vetoed a bill to create rural schools under army control. Federico Laredo Brú served the concluding years of Gómez' term leading the way for an ambitious Batista.

Social and economic programs
Under Federico Laredo Brú, amnesties were granted including to the brutal, former dictator Gerardo Machado and the Cuban Congress passed many social welfare measures as well as laws creating pensions, insurance, minimum wages, and limited working hours.

In 1937 Laredo Brú pushed for the passage of the Law of Sugar Coordination which organized small farmers into cooperatives and unionized agricultural workers, guaranteed tenant farmers a share of their crop and that they were not to be deprived of their fields if they worked them.

Laredo Brú  also issued a decree that stated all businesses should be headed by Cuban nationals. Workers unionized, particularly into the Confederation of Cuban Workers, a union in which Communists had substantial influence.

Cuban-U.S. relations
Though the United States had been a dominant force in Cuban politics since 1898 causing anti-American sentiment among the educated, the U.S. presence was lessened under Brú.

MS St. Louis
On May 27, 1939, the ocean liner MS St. Louis arrived, carrying 930 Jewish refugees from Hamburg, Germany fleeing Hitler's persecutions, and was refused permission to land by Laredo Brú.  Cuban government-issued landing certificates held by the passengers had been invalidated by Laredo Brú's government during their transit. Two persons attempted suicide and dozens more threatened to do the same.  Ultimately, only 22 Jewish refugees, 4 Spaniards and 2 Cuban nationals were permitted to disembark at Havana and the ship, having likewise failed to enter the U.S. and Canada, ultimately disembarked its remaining passengers in England, France, Belgium and the Netherlands.

Death
Former president Laredo Bru died of a heart malady in Havana at the age of seventy-one.

References

  (Spanish)

1875 births
1946 deaths
People from Remedios, Cuba
Cuban people of Spanish descent
Presidents of Cuba
Vice presidents of Cuba
1930s in Cuba
1940s in Cuba
20th-century Cuban politicians